Llanarthney is a village and community in Carmarthenshire, south-west Wales. Situated on the B4300 road 12 km (7.5 miles) east of Carmarthen and 10 km (6 miles) west of Llandeilo, the community had a population at the 2001 census of 738, of whom 61 per cent were Welsh-speaking. At the 2011 Census the population had increased slightly to 765.

Llanarthney is bordered (clockwise from the north) by the Carmarthenshire communities of Llanegwad, Llangathen, Llanfihangel Aberbythych, Gorslas, Llanddarog, Llangunnor, and Abergwili.

Amenities
Llanarthney has been home to the National Botanic Garden of Wales since 2000.
 Llanarthney Village Hall

References

External links
www.geograph.co.uk : photos of Llanarthney and surrounding area

Communities in Carmarthenshire
Villages in Carmarthenshire